Meat Hope Inc. was a meat processing and  wholesaling company headquartered in Tomakomai, Hokkaido, Japan. It went bankrupt in 2007 after several scandals of fraudulently labeling foodstuffs, including a ground beef fraud scandal.

The fraud came to light after a former executive felt called upon to become a whistleblower. This led to the opening of Japan's Consumer Affairs Agency on September 1, 2009, a month ahead of schedule.

Summary 
Meat Hope was established in 1976 by Minoru Tanaka. When Mr. Tanaka, who originally worked for a different meat provider, founded his company, he originally focused on the production and supplying of meat products.  In January 2006, they had about 100 employees and about 500 employees if including associated companies.

After graduating from junior high school, Mr. Tanaka worked his way up the corporate ladder. In doing so, he helped expand the business and grow the company. With Mr. Tanaka as the president and supported by his sons as executives and presidents of associated companies, the company was a typical family business (See also #Associated Companies).

Also, in April 2006, a year before the ground beef fraud scandal, Mr. Tanaka was awarded the Minister of Education, Culture, Sports, Science and Technology Commendation for Innovation (he later returned the commendation). He was awarded for the development of "a processor that could uniformly mix the red meat and fat in ground beef."

However, after getting the commendation and while the fraud was being conducted, .

Mr. Tanaka did research on meat himself and from within the company was said to be a "genius" who knew a lot about meat. However, the reality was that in order to bring the costs down on the so called "product development", they would mix in food additives along with other inexpensive products such as cow and pig innards, and discarded meats. The plan was to make ground meat look good through artificial means (more details in the next section).

On June 6, 2007, the scandal over the fraudulent labeling of the quality of Hope Meat's ground beef began. With many instances of the mislabeling of food coming to light, it became impossible to continue company operations. Then on July 17 of the same year, Meat Hope applied for personal bankruptcy. And on the same day, it was decided to commence with bankruptcy proceedings. Their total debt was about 670,000,000 yen. A meeting of Hope Meat's creditors was held on November 20 of the same year. However, among Meat Hope's client companies, one company experienced a loss adding up to tens of millions of yen. So the recovery of all of Hope Meat's debt was hopeless. On August 7, 2008, due to the lack of expenses, the company was closed due to bankruptcy, i.e., it ceased to exist as a legal entity. The head office building also remained after the sale. However, since no buyers were found, it was demolished and now no longer exists.

Minoru Tanaka was arrested and prosecuted. Then on March 19, 2008, he was sentenced to prison for 4 years by the Sapporo District Court for the violation of the Unfair Competition Prevention Law. Mr. Tanaka said he wanted to atone for his crimes, so he will accept the courts verdict and not seek an appeal from the Sapporo High Court.

The meat fraud scandal

The ground beef fraud scandal 
The reason for Meat Hope's meat fraud whistleblowing complaint and the scandal coming to light was because of the company's managing director, Kiroku Akahane. In the continuous coverage of the Meat Hope scandal and Mr. Akahane's whistleblowing by the "Hoppo Journal", Mr. Akahane stated, "I didn't want things to end with me being just a co-conspirator."

Mr. Akahane was born in 1935 in Nagano Prefecture. After graduating from Nagano Prefecture's Kamiina Agricultural High School, he worked at the Iida branch office of Ministry of Justice's Legal Affairs Bureau. Then he joined Sankyo Seiki Manufacturing (currently known as Nidec Sankyo Corporation) at their main office in Shimosuwa, Suwa District, Nagano Prefecture. He was then put in charge of the sales department of Sankyo Shoji, an associated company of Sankyo Seiki Manufacturing (it was later merged into Nidec Sankyo). After which he became managing director for Sanwa Industries, Ltd.

In 1978, Mr. Akahane was hired as a managing director of Noboribetsu Prince Hotel, which is part of the Noguchi-Kanko Group hotel chain. He would also work as a general manager at the Tomakomai Prince Hotel and the Muroran Prince Hotel (unrelated to the Prince Hotels run by Seibu Group). In 1995, after retiring at the age of 60, Mr. Akahane was hired by Minoru Tanaka (president of Meat Hope) because of Mr. Akahane's experience managing local tourist destinations. Before his retirement in 2006, he was a managing director.

After joining Meat Hope, Mr. Akahane made use of his many connections he had made as a business executive to expand into other markets such as Honshu. His job did not bring him into the factory, so he was late to realize the ongoing food fraud. Once he knew what was actually occurring at his company, he went to Mr. Tanaka (the company's president) in an attempt to fix the situation. However, Mr. Tanaka did not heed Mr. Akahane's warnings. Moreover, since the company was run by Mr. Tanaka's family, Mr. Akahane felt it was difficult to reform the company from within. In order to fix things, Mr. Akahane hoped to improve the company through administrative guidance. He anonymously filed complaints at various administrative bodies, such as Tomakomai's Health Center, the city's school lunch center, the Ministry of Agriculture, Forestry and Fisheries (MAFF), the Hokkaido District Agriculture Office, etc. Mr. Akahane claimed that he was suffering mentally because of Mr. Tanaka's management policies and handling of the food fraud complaints. Mr. Akahane stated that in 2000 (5 years after joining the company) he began taking sleeping pills and anti-depressants.

In April 2006, Mr. Akahane resigned from Meat Hope. After revealing his identity, he brought a sample of the fraudulently labeled ground beef to the MAFF's Hokkaido District Agriculture Office and requested an investigation. However, the Hokkaido office refused to accept the sample and Meat Hope's leaders did nothing. The MAFF later stated, "While documents confirm Akahane's visit to the Hokkaido office, there is nothing that confirms that he brought any meat for testing." The MAFF then later stated, "Because we recognize that the company is from within Hokkaido, we are requesting that the Hokkaido government take action on March 24." However, the Hokkaido Government's Department of Environment and Living replied, "There are no such records." It was unclear as to who held responsibility, the MAFF or the Hokkaido Government. However, since Meat Hope opened a Tokyo office in 2006, jurisdiction was said to fall under the MAFF.

Later, several people from the leadership ranks of Meat Hope resigned. And like Mr. Akahane, they started complaining to the news media. However, they were ignored by the Hokkaido Shimbun and the NHK.

In the spring of 2007, the Asahi Shimbun started an investigation after receiving a complaint. The results of a DNA test of a frozen beef korokke detected pork, chicken and other types of meat, proving meat fraud. Based on this investigation, the Asahi Shimbun reported on the detection of pork found in "CO-OP beef korokkes" produced by Hokkaido
KaTOkichi (a consolidated subsidiary of KaTOkichi, now known as TableMark Co.,Ltd.) on June 20 of the same year. KaTOkichi's own investigation reported that it was not a mistake of handling the ingredients by Hokkaido KaTOkichi, but that a person in charge at Meat Hope stated that Meat Hope "mixed pork into the beef paid for" by Hokkaido KaTOkichi.

At a Meat Hope press conference, the company president emphasized meat fraud was an "accident" and not done "intentionally." However, at the urging the eldest son of the company director, he appeared on TV in which he admitted to personally participating in the meat fraud. At this time, Meat Hope's president had a paper that calculated the costs of mixing the meat.

Later, outside of mixing substances like pork, chicken, pork innards and bread scraps into the ground meat that was labeled as "100% Beef" in order to dilute the amount of beef, Meat Hope was shown to have blood mixed in to adjust the ground meat's color and flavor enhancements mixed in to adjust the flavor.

Furthermore, Meat Hope was found to have used meat beyond its expiration date and meat that had been returned by customers because of some complaint or another; changed the label of damaged or contaminated meat and ship it out to customers; mixed already stinking rotting meat into other offal and making things such as restructured steak; imported poultry meat from Brazil, labeled it as "domestic poultry" and supplied it to organizations such as the Japan Self-Defense Forces; falsified the data showing salmonella was found in sausages and then supplied said sausages to school lunch firms that provide lunch for elementary and junior high schools; used rain water to thaw out frozen meats; and many other dishonest acts of Meat Hope came to light.

On June 24, 2007, the Hokkaido police carried out a search of Meat Hope's main office as well as 10 other locations under the suspicion of violating Japan's Unfair Competition Prevention Law (false labeling).

Meat Hope's president continued to pass the blame to others in statements given to the media and at the public trial. He said things such as "Even the customers who are happy with the half-off sale have complaints about the products" and "Because we cannot increase the price on our business customers, we chose to continue our business practices [of mixing in other substances to keep costs down]." On the other hand, he did apologize for making people worried about their food.

Impact on business clients 
According to the MAFF investigation, from July 2006 to June 2007, Meat Hope distributed a total of 9,838 tons of ground beef to general customers (4,300 tons), business clients (5,504 tons) and specialty facilities (34 tons).
 KaTOkichi – A total of 20 kinds of korokke were recalled for using ingredients bought from Meat Hope.
 An investigation showed that Hokkaido KaTOkichi's plant manager illegally sold to Meat Hope frozen korokkes that were intended to be thrown out. Which in turn brought in somewhere between 200,000 to 300,000 yen in illegal profits. It was said that these earnings were used for the purpose of strengthening ties within the company and were not recorded in the company's profits. Because of this scandal, the parent company KaTOkichi dismissed Hokkaido KaTOkichi's plant manager.
 
 Japanese Consumers' Co-operative Union – Pork was mixed into 23 products designated as beef.
 Japan Tobacco – Voluntary recall of a total of 6 kinds of frozen korokke that used ground beef.
 Mister Donut – Due to the buying of bacon from Meat Hope, they stopped selling soup.
 AEON – Sales of the ready-made beef korokke suspended.
 The city of Tomakomai's public elementary and junior high school lunches – Brazilian made poultry was fraudulently labeled as Japanese made. Also, bacteria such as salmonella detected in hams and sausages delivered to the lunch center.
 Additionally, Meat Hope sold 14 tons of ground meat for school lunches in 22 Japanese prefectures.

Impact on the whistleblower 
All this information came from whistleblowing. Which in turn created a bit of a stir in the then current state of the whistleblower system. Furthermore, Japan passed the Whistleblower Protection Act on April 1, 2006. At about the same time, Akahane resigned from Meat Hope and began revealing what was going on at Meat Hope under his real name.

However, a deep scar remained in the whistleblower Akahane. In 2010, Akahane published "I Will Not Stop Pointing the Finger – The Truth of the Meat Hope Scandal" through the publishing company Nagasaki Shuppan KK. In the book he wrote of the pain he still felt in his heart, "I never thought I would still be feeling it today."

After the scandal was proven to be true, Akahane was put directly into the public eye by the mass media. He felt horrible that his family and relatives were being dragged along with him. During the time he was fervently trying to bring to light what had occurred at Meat Hope, the mass media ignored him. However, due to the reporting by Asahi Shimbun which shed light on the scandal, the new media came upon him uninvited. Moreover, without asking or confirming with Akahane, the media would write stories about Akahane's personal life. He said he felt they were "rude in how they caused [him] trouble."

Akahane, who was forced to struggle on alone, was criticized by a former client who said, "Did he [Akahane] push us meat products while knowing they were fraudulent?" Memories of the scandal and losing contact with his former Meat Hope co-workers is painful for Akahane. Being in the public eye caused him to suffer from sleeplessness and bipolar disorder. His wife divorced him and his relatives stated they wanted nothing to do with him. He left Tomakomai, where he lived, and lives by himself in his childhood home in Nagano Prefecture.

In 2017, ten years after the scandal, Akahane told Yahoo! News, "If I could go back to that time, I would not blow the whistle on Meat Hope." He said, "Whistleblowing ruins a person. You may be turning a blind-eye to what's going on, but if you don't like it, then just keep quiet and just quit. Even if blowing the whistle is to protect other people or to protect the world, if you cannot protect yourself, there is no point." and "Because I spoke up, I became bipolar and I no longer see my family or friends. And because my name was spread around by the mass media, it caused trouble for my siblings." He also expressed his resent when he said, "If the government or the media had just done something when I had reported on Meat Hope anonymously, I wouldn't have had to reveal my name. I wouldn't have gotten a mental disorder. I wouldn't have lost everything."

As to the failure to act sooner by the relevant authorities, Akahane has repeatedly spoken to many sources including Hoppo Journal since the scandal came to light in 2008. He has said, "If the authorities had done something sooner, the business could have been improved. Without sending the company president Mr. Tanaka to prison, without the company going into bankruptcy, and without my losing my job."

Akahane says that he no longer reads his own book. Yasuko Jikumaru, a journalist who helped Akahane write his book, concluded his book by saying, "While he is a whistleblower who brought about definite change in food safety, he feels that the day when everyone praises people like him will probably never come. The day when he finally feels at peace will probably never come."

Similarly to Akahane's situation, a whistleblower from warehouser Nishinomiya Reizo brought light to a scandal involving the warehouser's client company Snow Brand. During the 2001 mad cow disease outbreak, Snow Brand fraudulently labeled Australian beef as Japanese beef.

Associated companies 
 Eat-Up Inc. (Est. November 1995. Official Japanese Website)
 Head Office: 1-5-14, Yanagi-cho, Tomakomai, Hokkaido (same address as their Tomakomai branch restaurant)
 Eat-Up Inc. manages the yakiniku and shabu-shabu all-you-can-eat Eat-Up restaurant chain (Tomakomai branch, Chitose branch, and Iwamizawa branch)
 Eat-Up Inc. was once a consolidated subsidiary of Meat Hope. It is managed by the eldest son of Meat Hope's former president Mr. Tanaka. As of 2020, it is still in operation.
 Barusu Meat Inc. (Est. July 1991)
 Head office: 4-11-26, Tokai-cho, Tomakomai, Hokkaido
 Barusu Meat Inc. was once a consolidated subsidiary of Meat Hope. It was managed by the second son of Meat Hope's former president Mr. Tanaka.

Also, 5 of the 70 former Meat Hope employees got together and started selling "Honest Korokke" in April 2008.

See also 
 Restructured steak
 Whistleblower
 Consumer Affairs Agency

References

Bibliography 
 Books
 

 Magazines
 
 
 
 
 

 Newspaper Articles
 
 

 Documentary Programs
 
 

 Government Reports
 （）

External links 
 News Feature – Ground Beef Fraud (in Japanese) – Asahi Shimbun
 News articles related to Meat Hope (in Japanese – Official Blog of the Monthly Magazine "Hoppo Journal"
 Points of Pride and Regret of Whistleblowers after the Scandals End (in Japanese) – Yahoo! News

Food and drink companies established in 1976
Food and drink companies disestablished in 2008
Food safety scandals
Corporate crime
Whistleblowing
Scandals in Japan
Japanese companies disestablished in 2008
Japanese companies established in 1976
Companies that have filed for bankruptcy in Japan